Sarath Assembly constituency is an assembly constituency in  the Indian state of Jharkhand.

Overview
Sarath Assembly constituency covers: Sarath and Palojori Police Stations in Deoghar district and Karmatanr, Shahajpur, Pindari, Lakhanpur, Rataniya, Rampurbhitra and Kajra gram panchayats in Jamtara Police Station in Jamtara district.

Sarath Assembly constituency is part of Dumka (Lok Sabha constituency).

Members of Legislative Assembly

See also
Sarath
Palojori
Jamtara block
Jharkhand Legislative Assembly
List of states of India by type of legislature

References

Assembly constituencies of Jharkhand